was a Japanese Magic: The Gathering player. The bulk of his success was on the Grand Prix circuit, where he reached the top eight seventeen times. In addition to his Grand Prix success, Ishida had success in the teams format, with second-place finishes at Pro Tour Seattle 2004 and at the Master Series in Tokyo (2001) and Osaka (2002). He died on January 13, 2013.

Achievements

References

External links
In memory of Itaru Ishida (in Japanese)

Japanese Magic: The Gathering players
1979 births
2013 deaths
People from Chiyoda, Tokyo